LFG may refer to:
 Landfill gas, a waste gas containing methane and other gases emitted by landfills
 Lexical functional grammar, a theory of syntax
 Lagged Fibonacci generator, an example of a pseudorandom number generator
 "Looking for group", a phrase often used in MMORPGs such as World of Warcraft
 Looking for Group, a fantasy-based webcomic
 Luft-Fahrzeug-Gesellschaft, a German aircraft manufacturer of World War I, known primarily for their "Roland" designs
 LandAmerica Financial Group (NYSE: LFG), a Fortune 500 company that provides title insurance and other real estate transaction services
 Lycée Français de Gavà Bon Soleil
 LFG (film), 2021 American documentary film